Justice Woodward may refer to:

Augustus B. Woodward (1774–1827), the first chief justice of the Michigan Territory
George Washington Woodward (1809–1875), chief justice of the Supreme Court of Pennsylvania 
Philip Woodward (judge) (1912–1997), justice of the Supreme Court of New South Wales
William G. Woodward (1808–1871), associate justice of the Iowa Supreme Court

See also
Judge Woodward (disambiguation)